Ross Parsley is the lead pastor of One Chapel, a community of churches in Austin, Kyle, Spicewood and Liberty Hill, Texas.

A graduate of Oral Roberts University, Ross led worship for over 20 years in Colorado churches and led several outreach teams to other countries before starting One Chapel in Austin in 2010. He is the worship leader on Integrity Music's "Lord of the Harvest", "Around Your Throne", "I Am Free", "My Savior Lives", and most recently, "Counting on God", as well as co-producer for the Desperation Band.  His wife, Aimee, ministers with him and they have five children.

Prior to One Chapel, Ross was the worship pastor of New Life Church, a megachurch in Colorado Springs, Colorado, where he was responsible for all the weekend services and oversaw all the worship ministries within the church, including its musical ministry. While at New Life Church, Ross and his brothers. Brad and Brent Parsley, created CD's of music frequently played during worship services.  A popular Christmas CD, Heaven Rejoices, produced by Ross and Don Harris, was a very well received Christmas music CD, including a number of original songs. The CD's were available at the time through the church. Ross served as the interim senior pastor at New Life Church before Pastor Brady Boyd was selected as the new senior pastor of New Life Church after the dismissal of former Senior Pastor Ted Haggard.

Books 
Parsley has written the following Christian books:

 Do You See What I See?: Exploring the Christmas of Every Day (Published in 2008)
 Messy Church: A Multigenerational Mission for God's Family (Published in 2011)

References

External links
 ONEchapel website

Living people
Year of birth missing (living people)
American Christian clergy
Oral Roberts University alumni
Performers of contemporary worship music